Kharpahlu (also Romanized as Khārpahlū) is a village in Javersiyan Rural District, Qareh Chay District, Khondab County, Markazi Province, Iran. At the 2006 census, its population was 134, in 33 families.

References 

Populated places in Khondab County